Colin Niven (6 September 1903 – 1 December 1968) was an Australian rules footballer who played for Fitzroy and Melbourne in the Victorian Football League (VFL).

Family
The son of Colin Niven (1870-1938), and Ida Bell Niven (1875-1947), née Lewis, Colin Leslie Niven was born at Bealiba, Victoria on 6 September 1903.

His cousin once removed, Gordon Jones, also played for Melbourne.

He married Ada Dorothy Smith in 1934.

Footballer
Niven, a follower, played in the Ballarat Football League prior to joining Fitzroy. He captain-coached Fitzroy in 1930 and 1931 before crossing to Melbourne, which he captained in 1934 and 1935. His brother Ray, who played beside Colin in 1931, later reunited with him at Melbourne where they again appeared together in the same side.

After six months out of the game, Niven was appointed playing coach of Donald in 1936 and he led the team to premierships in 1936, 1937 and 1939 before retiring as a player.

Military service
Niven later served in the Royal Australian Air Force during World War II.

Death
He died at Cowes, Victoria on 1 December 1968.

Footnotes

References
Holmesby, Russell and Main, Jim (2007). The Encyclopedia of AFL Footballers. 7th ed. Melbourne: Bas Publishing.

External links

 Colin Niven, at Demonwiki.
 Colin Niven, at Boyles Football Photos.

1903 births
1968 deaths
Australian rules footballers from Victoria (Australia)
Fitzroy Football Club players
Fitzroy Football Club coaches
Melbourne Football Club players
Melbourne Football Club captains
Maryborough Football Club players
Military personnel from Victoria (Australia)
Royal Australian Air Force personnel of World War II
Royal Australian Air Force airmen